The NCAA Division III Women's Outdoor Track and Field Championships are the annual collegiate track and field competitions for women athletes representing Division III institutions organised by the National Collegiate Athletic Association. Athletes' performances in individual championships earn points for their institutions and the team with the most points receives the NCAA team title in track and field. A separate NCAA Division III men's competition is also held. These two events are separate from the NCAA Division III Women's Indoor Track and Field Championships and NCAA Division III Men's Indoor Track and Field Championships held during the winter.

The first edition of the championship was held in 1982. Following the enactment of Title IX.

Results

Scoring
 1982–1984: the top 12 finishers scored for their team with points being awarded 15, 12, 10, 9, 8, 7, 6, 5, 4, 3, 2, 1.
 1985–present: the top 8 finishers scored, with points awarded 10, 8, 6, 5, 4, 3, 2, 1. In the place of a tie of two or more people the total points for those accumulated places are added up and divided by the number of people.

Team Champions

Champions

Team titles
List updated through 2021.

Individual titles
List updated through the 2019 Championships; top 10 teams only

 Schools highlight in yellow have reclassified athletics from NCAA Division III.

See also
NCAA Women's Outdoor Track and Field Championship (Division I, Division II)
AIAW Intercollegiate Women's Outdoor Track and Field Champions
NAIA Women's Outdoor Track and Field Championship
NCAA Men's Outdoor Track and Field Championship (Division I, Division II, Division III)
NCAA Women's Outdoor Track and Field Championship (Division I, Division II)
NCAA Men's Indoor Track and Field Championship (Division I, Division II, Division III)
NCAA Women's Indoor Track and Field Championship (Division I, Division II, Division III)
Pre-NCAA Outdoor Track and Field Champions

References

External links
NCAA Division III women's outdoor track and field

 Outdoor
Outdoor track, women, Division III
Women's athletics competitions